The Medical University metro station is situated intermediate on Saburtalo Line in Tbilisi, Georgia. It opened in 1979 as Komkavshiri until being renamed in 1992. The station is named after Tbilisi State Medical University.

Railway stations opened in 1979
Tbilisi Metro stations
1979 establishments in Georgia (country)